Hans Richter may refer to:

Hans Richter (conductor) (1843–1916), Austrian conductor
 (1882–1971), designer of the Volksbühne in Berlin and villa Heller in Ústí nad Labem
Hans Richter (artist) (1888–1976), German-born American artist and filmmaker
Hans Richter (actor) (1919–2008), German actor and director
Hans Peter Richter (1926–1993), German author, wrote books for children and young adults
Hans Werner Richter (1908–1993), German novelist and organiser of the "Group 47" writers' group
Hans Richter (footballer) (born 1959), former East German footballer